Anton Vladimirovich Gudukin (born 12 November 1982) is a Russian former professional footballer.

Club career
He played 8 seasons in the Russian Football National League for FC KAMAZ Naberezhnye Chelny.

External links
 
 

1982 births
People from Belaya Kalitva
Living people
Russian footballers
Association football defenders
FC Rostov players
FC Slavyansk Slavyansk-na-Kubani players
FC KAMAZ Naberezhnye Chelny players
FC Taganrog players
Sportspeople from Rostov Oblast